Sex and the Single Man is third solo album by guitarist/singer/songwriter Ray Parker Jr. released in 1985 on the Arista label. The record includes the singles "Girls Are More Fun" and "One Sided Love Affair".

Track listing

Personnel 
 Ray Parker Jr. – lead vocals, backing vocals, keyboards, guitars, bass, drums, arrangements (1-4, 6, 7, 8)
 Chuckii Booker – keyboards 
 Joe Curiale – keyboards 
 Steve Halquist – synthesizers
 Paul Jackson Jr. – guitars 
 Ed Greene – drums 
 Charles Green – saxophones 
 Earl Dumler – oboe
 Gene Page – arrangements (5)
 Ollie E. Brown – backing vocals 
 Arnell Carmichael – backing vocals 
 Gwyn Foxsworth – backing vocals 
 Randy Hall – backing vocals 
 Michael Henderson – backing vocals 
 J.D. Nicholas – backing vocals 
 Lylian (Tynes) Perry – backing vocals, vocal solo (6)
 Anita Sherman – backing vocals 
 The Valley People – additional backing vocals

Production
 Ray Parker Jr. – producer, engineer, mixing 
 Reggie Dozier – additional engineer 
 Steve Halquist – additional engineer 
 Brian Gardner – mastering at Bernie Grundman Mastering (Hollywood, California)
 Ria Lewerke – art direction 
 Sue Reilly – design 
 Andrew Sackheim – photography 
 Mary Stern – title lettering

References

[ AllMusic]
Discogs

External links
 
 Sex And The Single Man at Discogs
 Official Website
 Facebook Page
 MySpace Page
 Soulwalking page
 Ray Parker Jr 2012 Audio Interview at Soulinterviews.com

1985 albums
Arista Records albums
Ray Parker Jr. albums
Albums produced by Ray Parker Jr.